The Birch River is a river of Alberta, Canada. It starts in the Birch Mountains then flows eastward into Lake Claire, where it forms a small delta.

See also
List of rivers of Alberta

References

Rivers of Alberta